Abeba may refer to:

Abeba Haile, Eritrean singer
Addis Ababa, capital city of Ethiopia; alternately spelled Addis Abeba
Duke of Addis Abeba - title using this spelling
Ethiopian Catholic Archeparchy of Addis Abeba
Addis Abeba Stadium
Royal College, Addis Abeba

See also
Abebe Bikila (1932–1973), Ethiopian runner
Addis Abebe (born 1970), Ethiopian runner